Acrasia is a genus of moths in the family Geometridae.

Species
Acrasia contains the following species:

 Acrasia accepta Krüger, 2013
 Acrasia amoena Krüger, 2013
 Acrasia ava (Prout L. B., 1938)
 Acrasia avellanata Krüger, 2013
 Acrasia chimalensis Krüger, 2013
 Acrasia crinita Felder & Rogenhofer, 1875 - type species.
 Acrasia drakensbergensis (Herbulot, 1992)
 Acrasia dukei Krüger, 2013
 Acrasia grandis Krüger, 2013
 Acrasia lechriogramma Krüger, 2013
 Acrasia lenzi Krüger, 2013
 Acrasia modesta Krüger, 2007
 Acrasia monticola Krüger, 2013
 Acrasia nyangica Krüger, 2013
 Acrasia punctillata (Prout L. B., 1938)
 Acrasia robusta Krüger, 2013
 Acrasia similis Krüger, 2013
 Acrasia sympatrica Krüger, 2013

References

Nacophorini
Geometridae genera